Marguerite Jones (later Davis; November 3, 1917 – May 9, 1995) was a Canadian pitcher who played in the All-American Girls Professional Baseball League. Listed at 5' 9", 150 lb., she batted and threw right handed.

Born in Regina, Saskatchewan, Marguerite Jones was one of the 68 girls from Canada who played in the All-American Girls Professional Baseball League during its 12-year history.

Jones pitched in the league during the 1944 season, but without much success. She opened the year with the Minneapolis Millerettes and was traded to the Rockford Peaches in the midseason, posting a combined record of 6-12 and a 3.70 earned run average in 28 pitching appearances. Even though she batted a meager .162 average in 33 games, Jones walked 24 times to collect a solid .387 on-base percentage and also swiped 25 bases.

Jones returned to Canada during the offseason to marry Gordon Davis in 1945. She then left the league behind and played softball in Regina for several years, while raising a family of four children: Ron, Jerry, Carol and Tom. By 1958, the family moved to Moose Jaw. She was widowed in 1985.

Marguerite, who earned the nickname ″The Lady″ because of her sweet and gentle temperament, rejoined her former teammates and opponents during the inaugural ceremony of Women in Baseball at the Baseball Hall of Fame and Museum in Cooperstown, New York.

She later developed Alzheimer's disease, and died in 1995 at the age of 77. "As her short time memory failed, her long term memory actually improved for a while", explained her son, Ron. "Among her most cherished memories was her time in the AAGPBL and the sport she loved", he added.

Three years after her death, Marguerite gained honorary induction into the Canadian Baseball Hall of Fame.

Career statistics
Pitching

Batting 

Fielding

References

All-American Girls Professional Baseball League players
Minneapolis Millerettes players
Rockford Peaches players
Canadian baseball players
Sportspeople from Regina, Saskatchewan
Baseball people from Saskatchewan
Neurological disease deaths in Saskatchewan
Deaths from Alzheimer's disease
1917 births
1995 deaths
20th-century American women